African Revival is a UK charity (registered charity no: 1108718) which focuses on providing access to quality education in sub Saharan Africa - Uganda, Zambia and South Sudan

History
African Revival was founded in 2005 by the UK businessman Tony Allen, who remains closely involved as the chair of the board of trustees.

References

External links 
 African Revival Website

Non-profit organisations based in the United Kingdom